Jung-hwan, also spelled Jeong-hwan or Jong-hwan, is a Korean masculine given name. The meaning differs based on the hanja used to write each syllable of the name. There are 75 hanja with the reading "jung" and 21 hanja with the reading "hwan" on the South Korean government's official list of hanja which may be used in given names.

People with this name include:

Entertainers
Kim Jeong-hwan (born 1974), stage name Kim Poong, South Korean actor
Shin Jung-hwan (born 1975), South Korean singer and comedian
Seol Jung-hwan (born 1985), South Korean actor and model
Kim Jung-hwan (born 1990), stage name Eddy Kim, South Korean singer
Lee Jung-hwan (born 1992), stage name Sandeul, South Korean singer, member of boy band B1A4

Sportspeople
Yoon Jong-hwan (born 1973), South Korean football manager
Ahn Jung-hwan (born 1976), South Korean football player
Park Jung-hwan (footballer) (born 1977), South Korean football player
Kim Jung-hwan (fencer) (born 1983), South Korean fencer
An Jeong-hwan (born 1984), South Korean judo practitioner
Youm Jung-hwan (1985–2014), South Korean cyclist
Shin Jung-hwan (footballer) (born 1986), South Korean football player
Kim Jeong-hwan (volleyball) (born 1994), South Korean volleyball player
Kim Jeong-hwan (footballer) (born 1997), South Korean football player

Other
Bang Jeong-hwan (1899–1931), Joseon Dynasty activist who created Children's Day
Kim Jeong-hwan (poet) (born 1954), South Korean poet and novelist
Park Junghwan (born 1993), South Korean go player

See also
List of Korean given names

References

Korean masculine given names